The following lists events that happened during the 1630s in South Africa.

Events
 1631 - The Khoikhoi leader Autsumao, is taken to Batavia and is later returned to the Cape to serve as an interpreter. He also acts as the resident agent/postmaster for the passing ships
 1635 - The Portuguese Nossa Senhora runs aground near the mouth of the Umzimkulu River

Births

References
See Years in South Africa for list of References

History of South Africa